Dapdap Elementary School is a public elementary school in the town of Tangalan. It is under the Department of Education, district of Tangalan, division of Aklan, Region VI.

History
The first  school in barangay  Dapdap was at the terrace of the house of Mr. Marcos E. Traje located at the lot of Mr. Salvador Antaran.  It was for S.Y. 1934-1935 when the first class was held and the school was named Dapdap Primary School.

Dapdap Primary School became Dapdap Elementary School in S.Y. 2003–2004 with a total land area of 4,882 sq. m.

See also
 List of schools in Tangalan
 Education in the Philippines

References

External links

 DepEd Region VI Website
 Data.gov Website
 MOOE for 2014
 Dapdap Elementary School Facebook Page

Schools in Aklan
1930 establishments in the Philippines
Educational institutions established in 1930